The NED University of Engineering & Technology is a public university located in the urban area of Karachi, Sindh, Pakistan. It is one of the oldest and best engineering universities in Pakistan, acknowledged for its best teaching practices and graduates.

Founded as Prince of Wales Engineering College, it was renamed after Parsi landowner and its benefactor  Nadirshaw Edulji Dinshaw.

It is a recognized degree awarding university of Pakistan affiliated with the Higher Education Commission of Pakistan, a government-appointed body.

History

Pre-Independence 
Founded in 1921, as Prince of Wales Engineering College, to provide training to civil engineers working in building the Sukkur Barrage.  In 1924, college received donation of Rupee 150,000 from heirs of Nadirshaw Edulji Dinshaw. As a result, the college was renamed to NED Government Engineering College. The NED College first remained associated with the University of Bombay (now known as the University of Mumbai) for many years during the British Empire until 1947.

Post-Independence 
This university came to its modern form after being established by the British government and was taken over by the Government of Sindh in 1947. As Karachi continued to grow after the independence of Pakistan in 1947, and the old 'City Campus' became too crowded, a new 'Main Campus' was constructed on its present location on University Road, Karachi in 1975. Finally, on 1 March 1977, the NED Government Engineering College was granted the status of an engineering university. This university is named after its benefactor Nadirshaw Edulji Dinshaw.

Campuses 
The university is spread across three campuses; the main campus(Karachi), the city campus the LEJ campus, and the Thar campus..

Offered degree programs
NED University offers different undergraduate, postgraduate, and PhD programs. The university offers programmes in engineering, science, and architecture for undergraduate, postgraduate, and doctoral studies. In every year NED university also offers some courses for external students from Intermediate to onwards to enroll in some specially offered courses. For example diploma, a Course in programming, or Artificial Intelligence. It is a member of Association of Commonwealth Universities of the United Kingdom.

Faculties and departments
It is organized into following six faculties

Faculty of Civil and Petroleum Engineering (CPE)
The faculty of Civil and Petroleum Engineering comprises following departments.
 Department of Civil Engineering
 Department of Urban and Infrastructure Engineering
 Department of Petroleum Engineering
 Department of Earthquake Engineering

Faculty of Mechanical and Manufacturing Engineering (MME)
The faculty of Mechanical and Manufacturing Engineering comprises the following departments.
 Department of Mechanical Engineering
 Department of Textile Engineering
 Department of Industrial and Manufacturing Engineering
 Department of Automotive and Marine Engineering

Faculty of Electrical and Computer Engineering (ECE)
The faculty of Electrical and Computer Engineering comprises the following departments.
 Department of Electrical Engineering
 Department of Computer and Information Systems Engineering
 Department of Electronic Engineering
 Department of Telecommunications Engineering
 Department of Bio-Medical Engineering

Faculty of Information Sciences and Humanities (ISH)
The faculty * Department of Telecommunications Engineering of Information Sciences and Humanities comprises the following departments.
 Department of Software Engineering
 Department of Computer Science & Information Technology
 Department of Mathematics
 Department of Physics
 Department of Chemistry
 Department of Humanities

Faculty of Chemical and Process Engineering (CPE)
The faculty of Chemical and Process Engineering comprises the following departments.
 Department of Chemical Engineering
 Department of Materials Engineering
 Department of Metallurgical Engineering
 Department of Polymer and Petrochemical Engineering
 Department of Food Engineering
 Department of Environmental Engineering

Faculty of Architecture and Management Sciences (AMS)
The faculty of Architecture and Management Sciences comprises the following departments.
 Department of Architecture and Planning
 Department of Economics and Management Sciences

Activities
Students at NED university are very enthusiastic. They take part in other activities so, NED every year conducts  Sports Festa in which many games are included like football, table tennis, cricket, volleyball, and many others. Because Management wants students' physical fitness with studies as well.

Affiliated Colleges
 Government College of Technology (GCT)
 Institute of Industrial Electronics Engg. (IIEE)
 Institute of Aviation Technology, PAF
 PCSIR Pak Swiss Training Centre (PSTC)
 Karachi Tools, Dies & Moulds Centre
 Pakistan Marine Academy
 (formerly) Usman Institute of Technology
 College of Management Sciences

NED Academy
To provide low-cost educational and professional training to existing professionals, NED University established the NED Academy. The academy has two sections:
 Centre for Continuing Engineering Education (CCEE),
 Centre for Multidisciplinary Postgraduate Programmes (CMPP).

CCEE
CCEE offers courses for Engineering, Information Technology, Management and Conversion Programs. Short and long-duration courses are offered in these subjects. It s offered so that professionals, teachers, and students attain higher levels of research, information, and experience. It empowers them by boosting their skills, knowledge, and techniques. CCEE offers short courses to bring together new practitioners, and update engineering talent, technology, and opportunities for working engineers to improve the quality experience.

Research
Although the main focus of the university had been on its teaching programs, the university has started masters by Research and PhD programs. Different research groups and centers are also working in the university. The university publishes three research journals namely NED University Journal of Research, Journal of Social Sciences & Interdisciplinary Research, Journal of Research in Architecture & Planning.

Vice-Chancellors
 Sarosh Hashmat Lodi (2017 – present)

Notable alumni

Mohammad Zahoor, Ukraine-based, British businessman - founder and owner of the ISTIL Group. (Also called as Steel Man).
Ashraf Habibullah, co-creator of the first computer-based structural-engineering applications and Founder, President, and CEO of the structural-engineering software company Computers and Structures, Inc.
 Muhammad Hussain Panhwar: Pakistani scientist in the field of agriculture
 Khurram Murad: Pakistani Islamic scholar
 Rizwan Ahmed: Pakistan Administrative Service officer, NED University alumni
 Moiz Ullah Baig (International Scrabble player - Pakistan Scrabble Champion 2018 & World Junior Scrabble Champion 2018)
 Syed Murad Ali Shah: 29th and current chief minister of Sindh and a member of the Sindh Assembly.
 Elahi Bux Soomro: ex-Speaker of the National Assembly of Pakistan.
 Mohammad Aslam Uqaili: Vice-chancellor Mehran University of Engineering and Technology.
 Saeed Anwar: international cricketer, former captain of Pakistan cricket team.
 Ali Haider: musician, singer and actor.

See also
 List of universities in Karachi
 List of Universities in Pakistan
 Dawood University of Engineering and Technology
Rankings of universities in Pakistan
 Higher Education Commission of Pakistan
 Pakistan Engineering Council

Gallery

References

External links
 

Engineering universities and colleges in Pakistan

Public universities and colleges in Sindh
Universities and colleges in Karachi